Fellow of the Federation is the fellowship given out by the International Federation of Vexillological Associations (FIAV).

History

Established in 2001, the International Federation of Vexillological Associations Board awards this fellow to those who have 'made significant contributions to vexillology and/or for rendering significant service to FIAV (including service as an ICV Congress Organizing Representative (COR)) or a FIAV Member.'

Medal and Post Nominals

Recipients of this Fellowship are allowed to use the Post Nominal 'FF'.

According to the International Federation of Vexillogical Associations, when the award is given out 'A Fellow receives a certificate signed by the Board and a medal bearing the central knot device of the FIAV flag suspended from a chest ribbon of blue and yellow, the colors of the FIAV flag, as well as a miniature ribbon and a lapel pin.

See also
Vexillology
International Federation of Vexillological Associations

References

Medals
Vexillology
Flags
Fellowships